Olgun is both a Turkish given name and a surname. Notable people with the name include:

 Olgun Şimşek, Turkish actor
 Bayram Olgun, Turkish footballer
 Süleyman Olgun, Turkish footballer

See also
 Olgun, Ergani
 Olgun, Olur

Turkish-language surnames
Turkish unisex given names